The blue-headed sunbird (Cyanomitra alinae) is a species of bird in the family Nectariniidae.
It is found in Burundi, Democratic Republic of the Congo, Rwanda and Uganda.

References

blue-headed sunbird
Birds of Central Africa
Birds of Sub-Saharan Africa
blue-headed sunbird
Taxonomy articles created by Polbot